The Les Avants–Sonloup funicular is a metre gauge funicular railway in the Swiss canton of Vaud. It links the railway station of Les Avants, on the Montreux–Oberland Bernois railway between Montreux and Montbovon, with an upper terminus at Sonloup.

Description
The line is still operated with the original Belle Epoque carriages.

The peak season for tourists, is in the spring,  when the narcissus and forget-me-not plants flower in the meadowlands near the summit.

Parameters
The funicular has the following parameters:

The line is operated by Transports Montreux – Vevey Riviera, under the GoldenPass Services banner.

Gallery

See also 
 List of funicular railways
 List of funiculars in Switzerland
 List of heritage railways and funiculars in Switzerland

Further reading

References

External links 
 
 Les Avants–Sonloup funicular web site

Funicular railways in Switzerland
Defunct railway companies of Switzerland
Transport in the canton of Vaud
Metre gauge railways in Switzerland
Railway lines opened in 1912
1912 establishments in Switzerland
Heritage railways in Switzerland